Walter Gadsby may refer to:
 Walter Gadsby (footballer, born 1872), English footballer for Small Heath
 Walter Gadsby (footballer, born 1882), English footballer for Chesterfield